Sonic Subjunkies (sometimes abbreviated as SSJ) was a German Digital Hardcore band based in Berlin, best known for releasing records on Digital Hardcore Recordings.

History
Formed in the autumn of 1992, The band consisted of vocalist Holger Phrack,  programmer Rob Marvin and producer/programmer Thaddeus Herrmann. The trio would later go on to release two limited edition albums and a handful of singles on Digital Hardcore, before defecting to the label Iris Light in 1998 for the release of their album Molotov Lounge.

In later years Thaddi also contributed to other projects such as Herrmann & Kleine, but was also DJ for radio KISS FM Berlin and went on to be editor of the German music magazine de:bug. No new SSJ material has surfaced since 1998, but a re-released vinyl version of Molotov Lounge was bought out on Lux Nigra in 2004.

Discography
Suburban Soundtracks Pt.1 (12", EP)  Digital Hardcore Recordings (DHR)  1994
Sounds From The City Of Quartz (Cass)  Midi War  1995
Turntable Terrorist E.P. (12", EP)  Digital Hardcore Recordings (DHR)  1995
Live At The Suicide Club 8 - 7 - 95 (CD)  Digital Hardcore Recordings (DHR)  1998
Molotov Lounge (CD)  Iris Light Records  1999, re-released on Lux Nigra in 2004
With A Little Love / Sonic Junior (7", Pur)  Irritant  2000

External links
Discogs Page Sonic Subjunkies on Discogs

German electronic music groups
German techno music groups
Hardcore techno music groups
German industrial music groups
Digital hardcore music groups